The 2020 Christy Ring Cup Final was played at Croke Park in Dublin on 22 November 2020. It was contested by Kildare and Down.

Kildare won the competition for a second time in three years and third in total.

Down had qualified for the final by causing an upset through knocking Offaly out in the semi-final. The team did so in a first ever inter-county hurling penalty shootout. However, even though Down lost the ultimate game, both finalists were promoted to the 2021 Joe McDonagh Cup.

David Herity was Kildare manager.

Match details

Notes

References

Christy Ring Cup Final
Christy Ring Cup Finals
Christy Ring Cup
Down GAA matches
Kildare GAA matches